Qaleh-ye Tuq (also Romanized as Qal‘eh-ye Ţūq; also known as Ghal‘eh Toogh and Qal‘eh Ţūg) is a village in Qeblehi Rural District, in the Central District of Dezful County, Khuzestan Province, Iran. At the 2006 census, its population was 1,998, in 373 families.

References 

Populated places in Dezful County